Inge Andersen (born 23 March 1944) is a Danish former swimmer. She competed in the women's 200 metre breaststroke at the 1960 Summer Olympics.

References

External links
 

1944 births
Living people
Danish female breaststroke swimmers
Olympic swimmers of Denmark
Swimmers at the 1960 Summer Olympics
Swimmers from Copenhagen